The Norman Aviation Nordic VI is a Canadian fixed wing ultralight aircraft designed by Jacques Norman.

Design
The Nordic VI is a high-wing braced cabin monoplane with side-by-side seating. It has a steel tube fuselage with fabric-covered wooden structure wings and a fixed tail wheel landing gear. The main landing gear legs are titanium.

Variants
Nordic VI-912
Rotax 912 powered. 253 had been completed and flown by 2011.
Nordic VI-914
Rotax 914-powered. Three had been completed and flown by 2011.

Operational history
In November 2016 there were 21 Nordic VIs on the Transport Canada Civil Aviation Register.

Specifications

References

External links

1990s Canadian ultralight aircraft
Homebuilt aircraft